Michal Pavel (born June 16, 1986) is a Czech professional ice hockey player. He played with HC Sparta Praha in the Czech Extraliga during the 2010–11 Czech Extraliga postseason.

References

External links

1986 births
Czech ice hockey forwards
HC Sparta Praha players
Living people
HC Berounští Medvědi players